Khargushabad (also Romanized as Khargūshābād and Khargoosh Abad) is a village in Posht Rud Rural District, in the Central District of Narmashir County, Kerman Province, Iran. At the 2006 census, its population was 817, in 202 families.

References 

Populated places in Narmashir County